Namma Veettu Pillai is a 2019 Indian Tamil-language action comedy drama film written and directed by Pandiraj and produced by Kalanithi Maran under the banner Sun Pictures. The film stars Sivakarthikeyan and Aishwarya Rajesh, with a supporting cast including Anu Emmanuel, Samuthirakani, Soori, Bharathiraja, and Natarajan Subramaniam. The movie marks the third collaboration between Pandiraj and Sivakarthikeyan after Marina and Kedi Billa Killadi Ranga. The music for the film is scored by D. Imman, while cinematography and editing is handled by Nirav Shah and Ruben. The film released on 27 September 2019. The film received positive response from audience and become a successful venture  at the box office.

Plot
Arumpon is a village youth who has a beloved step sister Thulasi. Arumpon holds Puberty Showering function for his sister despite hesitance from his maternal uncles, who disregard Thulasi for unknown reasons. Even his paternal uncles disregard Arumpon's family and consider Thulasi as a curse on their family. The only people who care for Arumpon's family are his grandfather Arunmozhivarman and his cousin Paramu. Arumpon develops an Affection with his Maternal cousin Maangani, despite her father's disapproval. Arumpon actively looks for a Alliance for his sister because his maternal uncle disapproves Thulasi to be married of to their sons. Despite Arumpon finding a prospective groom for his sister, his paternal uncle foils it, and Thulasi's engagement is called off. Arumpon and Paramu have a running feud with Ayyanar, a ruffian and his uncle, since they close Ayyanar's liquor shop and stopped them from selling agricultural land via a court order. So, Ayyanar decides to marry Thulasi for retribution. Arumpon reluctantly agrees to the marriage on his mother's and Thulasi's insistence. It is revealed that Thulasi is Arumpon's adopted sister who was the daughter of Dharma, a close friend of Arumpon's late father Chandrabose, who adopted Thulasi after Dharma's death.

Ayyanar tries to insult Arumpon at every turn, but Arumpon takes it with a light-heart since he is his brother-in-law. Thulasi was falsely arrested for Ayyanar's illegal liquor hoarding. When confronted by Thulasi, Ayyanar hits her. Arumpon mercilessly thrashes Ayyanar for retribution. Following this incident, Ayyanar's close friend Paari comes with men to seek him and go after Arumpon for retribution. In a heated exchange, Paari insults Ayyanar for getting beaten up by his brother-in-law and in a drunken stupor, Ayyanar kills Paari accidentally. After realising what has transpired, Paari's men attempt to kill Ayyanar. Ayyanar escapes from them but not with closely trailed by men out for blood. No one comes for Ayyanar's rescue even his Maternal uncle, but Arumpon, and Thulasi manages to rescue him and handover to the police. Enraged by this, they seek to kill Arumpon too. To end this problem without bloodshed, Arumpon, his mother, and his sister surrender to the panchayat of Paari's Village. He explains that he knows the suffering of growing up without a father and wants to end this without further loss of life. Even though he can beat up every goon there and escape, he does not wish to do so. He offers to marry Paari's widowed Wife, but she compliments Arumpon's good nature and not wanting to make Thulasi widow agrees to end this peacefully.

During the film's closing credits, it is intended that Arumpon, Thulasi, and his mother have reconciled with the rest of the extended family. Ayyanar has been released on parole to attend Thulasi's Seemantham(Baby shower) and it is revealed that he made peace with Arumpon. The film ends comically with Arumpon breaking the fourth wall mimicking his grandfather.

Cast 
The cast includes:

Marketing 
The first look poster of the film was unveiled on 12 August 2019. The official trailer of the film was launched by Sun Pictures on 14 September 2019.

Soundtrack 

The music for the film was composed by D. Imman, with lyrics by Yugabharathi, Vignesh Shivan, Arunraja Kamaraj, GKB and actor Sivakarthikeyan. This is Imman's fifth collaboration with Sivakarthikeyan and his second collaboration with director Pandiraj.

The first single,"Yenga Annan" was released on 23 August 2019 with lyrics by Vignesh Shivan and sung by Nakash Aziz and Sunidhi Chauhan. The second single "Mailaanji" was released on 28 August 2019 with lyrics by Yugabharathi and sung by Shreya Ghoshal and Pradeep Kumar.

The full soundtrack was released on 1 September 2019, with Sivakarthikeyan, composer Imman, director Pandiraj and other cast and crew in attendance. The launch event was telecast on Sun TV, on 8 September 2019. After the film's release, an additional song from the film titled "Yenakkaagave Poranthavaley" which is sung by Sathyaprakash and written by Yugabharathi was released on 8 October 2019 through all digital streaming platforms.

The album received positive reviews from critics. Behindwoods rated the album 2.75 out of 5, stating that "Imman delivers another rural-celebratory commercial album with appealing tunes and lyrics high on family values and bonding!" Indiaglitz rated the album 3 out of 5 and stated that "Imman takes you on a rollercoaster ride of emotional, sentimental and fun music." Moviecrow rated the album 3 out of 5 and stated "Namma Veettu Pillai is Imman's better-packaged album in recent times and the tunes are consistently enjoyable despite strictly revolving around the known Imman's templates."

Release 
The film released worldwide on 27 September 2019. The film was also dubbed and released in Hindi as Ek Hazaron Mein Meri Behna Hai on YouTube by Goldmines Telefilms on 19 February 2021.

Reception 
The Times of India rated 3 out of 5, stating that "As a family drama, Namma Veettu Pillai is perfectly OK even though it offers us nothing new in terms of story or treatment."

Behindwoods rated the film 2.75 out of 5, stating that "Namma Veetu Pillai engages with strong emotions and family values."

Sify rated the film 3 out of 5 stars, viewing that "Namma Veettu Pillai is a well made rural family drama which is highly recommended!"

The Indian Express rated the film 3 out of 5, and summarised that "Barring a few missteps, this Sivakarthikeyan-starrer is a definite crowd-pleaser."

India Today rated the film 2.5 out of 5 stars and summarised that "Director Pandiraj's Namma Veetu Pillai starring Sivakarthikeyan is reminiscent of the filmmaker's previous film Kadaikutty Singam. However, the emotional connect seems to be missing in Namma Veetu Pillai."

Indiaglitz rated the film 3.25 out of 5, summarising that "Namma Veettu Pillai is the perfect movie to watch and relish over this long holiday weekend, much needed break that Sivakarthikeyan wanted. Watch it with your family to relish the lovely bond of a brother and sister."

Baradwaj Rangan of Film Companion South wrote " With better writing throughout, the climax would have made you weep. But, as empty emotional entertainers go, Namma Veettu Pillai isn't a total loss".

Box office 
The film collected  in Tamil Nadu on 5 weeks.

Legacy 
The song "Jigiri Dosthu" inspired a film of the same name.

References

External links
 

2010s action comedy-drama films
2010s Tamil-language films
2019 films
Films directed by Pandiraj
Films scored by D. Imman
Indian action comedy-drama films
Sun Pictures films